This is a partial listing of programs broadcast by the South Korean cable television channel tvN.

Dramas

Daily

Monday–Thursday (09:45)
 Ice Adonis (노란 복수초; February 27 – August 30, 2012) 
 Glass Mask (유리가면; September 3, 2012 – April 4, 2013)
 Crazy Love (미친사랑; April 8 – July 19, 2013) 
 Family Secret (가족의 비밀; October 27, 2014 – April 30, 2015)
 A Bird That Doesn't Sing (울지않는 새; May 4 – October 22, 2015)

Monday–Friday (09:45)
 Crazy Love (미친사랑; July 22 – September 17, 2013)

Monday–Tuesday

Monday–Tuesday (20:50)
 Missing: The Other Side 2 (미씽: 그들이 있었다 2; December 19, 2022 – January 31, 2023)
 Our Blooming Youth (청춘월담; February 6, 2023 – present)
 Family (패밀리; April 17, 2023)
 Beneficial Fraud (이로운 사기; May 29, 2023)

Monday–Tuesday (21:00)

 A Piece of Your Mind (반의 반; March 23 – April 28, 2020)
 My Unfamiliar Family ((아는 건 별로 없지만) 가족입니다; June 1 – July 21, 2020)
 Record of Youth (청춘기록; September 7 – October 27, 2020)
 Birthcare Center (산후조리원; November 2–24, 2020)
 Awaken (낮과 밤; November 30, 2020 – January 19, 2021)
 L.U.C.A.: The Beginning (루카: 더 비기닝; February 1 – March 9, 2021)
 Navillera (나빌레라; March 22 – April 27, 2021)
 Doom at Your Service (어느 날 우리 집 현관으로 멸망이 들어왔다; May 10 – June 29, 2021)
 You Are My Spring (너는 나의 봄; July 5 – August 24, 2021)

Monday–Tuesday (21:30)

 Because This Is My First Life (이번 생은 처음이라; October 9 – November 28, 2017)
 Cross (크로스; January 29 – March 20, 2018)
 A Poem a Day (시를 잊은 그대에게; March 26 – May 15, 2018)
 About Time (멈추고 싶은 순간: 어바웃타임; May 21 – July 10, 2018)
 Let's Eat 3 (식샤를 합시다 3; July 16 – August 28, 2018)
 100 Days My Prince (백일의 낭군님; September 10 – October 30, 2018)
 Tale of Fairy (계룡선녀전; November 5 – December 25, 2018)
 The Crowned Clown (왕이 된 남자; January 7 – March 4, 2019)
 He Is Psychometric (사이코메트리 그녀석; March 11 – April 30, 2019)
 Abyss (어비스; May 6 – June 25, 2019)
 Designated Survivor: 60 Days (60일, 지정생존자;  July 1 – August 20, 2019)
 The Great Show (위대한 쇼; August 26 – October 15, 2019)
 Catch the Ghost (유령을 잡아라; October 21 – December 10, 2019)
 Black Dog: Being A Teacher (블랙독; December 16, 2019 – February 4, 2020)
 The Cursed (방법; February 10 – March 17, 2020)

Monday–Tuesday (22:00)
 Basketball (빠스껫 볼; October 21 – December 31, 2013)
 I Need Romance 3 (로맨스가 필요해 3; January 13 – March 4, 2014)

Monday–Tuesday (22:30)

 High Class (하이클래스; September 6 – November 1, 2021)
 Secret Royal Inspector & Joy (어사와 조이; November 8 – December 28, 2021)
 Ghost Doctor (고스트 닥터; January 3 – February 22, 2022)
 Military Prosecutor Doberman (군검사 도베르만; February 28 – April 26, 2022)
 Dr. Park's Clinic (내과 박원장; May 16 – 31, 2022)
 Link: Eat, Love, Kill (링크: 먹고 사랑하라, 죽이게; June 6 – July 26, 2022)
 Poong, the Joseon Psychiatrist (조선 정신과 의사 유세풍; August 1 – September 6, 2022)
 Mental Coach Jegal (멘탈코치 제갈길; September 12 – November 1, 2022)
 Behind Every Star (연예인 매니저로 살아남기; November 7 – December 13, 2022)

Monday–Tuesday (23:00)

 I Need Romance (로맨스가 필요해; June 13 – August 2, 2011)
 Birdie Buddy (버디버디; August 8 – October 25, 2011)
 Cool Guys, Hot Ramen (꽃미남 라면가게; October 31 – December 20, 2011)
 Flower Band (닥치고 꽃미남밴드; January 30 – March 20, 2012) 
 The Wedding Scheme (결혼의 꼼수; April 2 – May 22, 2012)
 I Love Lee Taly (아이러브 이태리; May 28 – July 17, 2012)
 My Cute Guys (이웃집 꽃미남; January 7 – February 25, 2013)
 Nine (나인: 아홉 번의 시간여행; March 11 – May 14, 2013)
 Dating Agency: Cyrano (연애조작단; 시라노; May 27 – July 16, 2013)
 Who Are You? (후아유; July 29 – September 17, 2013)
 A Witch's Love (마녀의 연애; April 14 – June 10, 2014)
 High School King of Savvy (고교처세왕; June 16 – August 11, 2014)
 My Secret Hotel (마이 시크릿 호텔; August 18 – October 14, 2014)
 Liar Game (라이어게임; October 20 – November 18, 2014)
 Righteous Love (일리있는 사랑; December 1, 2014 – February 3, 2015)
 Hogu's Love (호구의 사랑; February 9 – March 31, 2015)
 Let's Eat 2 (식샤를 합시다 2; April 6 – June 2, 2015)
 Hidden Identity (신분을 숨겨라; June 16 – August 4, 2015)
 Ugly Miss Young-ae 14 (막돼먹은 영애씨 14; August 10 – October 5, 2015)
 Bubble Gum (풍선껌; October 26 – December 15, 2015)
 Cheese in the Trap (치즈인더트랩; January 4 – March 1, 2016)
 Pied Piper (피리부는 사나이; March 7 – April 26, 2016)
 Another Miss Oh (또 오해영; May 2 – June 28, 2016)
 Bring It On, Ghost (싸우자귀신아; July 11 – August 30, 2016)
 Drinking Solo (혼술남녀; September 5 – October 25, 2016)
 Ugly Miss Young-ae 15 (막돼먹은 영애씨 15; October 31, 2016 – January 3, 2017)
 Introverted Boss (내성적인 보스; January 16 – March 14, 2017)
 The Liar and His Lover (그녀는 거짓말을 너무 사랑해; March 20 – May 9, 2017)
 Circle (써클; May 22 – June 27, 2017)
 The Bride of Habaek (하백의 신부; July 3 – August 22, 2017)
 Argon (아르곤; September 4–26, 2017)

Tuesday (23:00)
 Reply 1997 (응답하라 1997; July 24 – September 18, 2012)

Wednesday–Thursday

Wednesday–Thursday (21:00)
 Manny (매니; April 13 – June 2, 2011)

Wednesday–Thursday (21:10)
 Prison Playbook (슬기로운 감빵생활; November 22, 2017 – January 18, 2018)
 Mother (마더; January 24 – March 15, 2018)
 My Mister (나의 아저씨; March 21 – May 17, 2018)

Wednesday–Thursday (21:30)

 Avengers Social Club (부암동 복수자들; October 11 – November 16, 2017)
 What's Wrong with Secretary Kim (김비서가 왜 그럴까; June 6 – July 26, 2018)
 Familiar Wife (아는 와이프; August 1 – September 20, 2018)
 The Smile Has Left Your Eyes (하늘에서 내리는 일억개의 별; October 3 – November 22, 2018)
 Encounter (남자친구; November 28, 2018 – January 24, 2019)
 Touch Your Heart (진심이 닿다; February 6 – March 28, 2019)
 Her Private Life (그녀의 사생활; April 10 – May 30, 2019)
 Search: WWW (검색어를 입력하세요: WWW; June 5 – July 25, 2019)
 When the Devil Calls Your Name (악마가 너의 이름을 부를 때; July 31 – September 19, 2019)
 Miss Lee (청일전자 미쓰리; September 25 – November 14, 2019)
 Psychopath Diary (싸이코패스 다이어리; November 20, 2019 – January 9, 2020)
 Money Game (머니게임; January 15 – March 5, 2020)

Wednesday–Thursday (22:30)

 Memorist (메모리스트; March 11 – April 30, 2020)
 Oh My Baby (오 마이 베이비; May 13 – July 2, 2020)
 Flower of Evil (악의꽃; July 29 – September 23, 2020)
 Tale of the Nine Tailed (구미호뎐; October 7 – December 3, 2020)
 True Beauty (여신강림; December 9, 2020 – February 4, 2021)
 Mouse (마우스; March 3 – May 20, 2021)
 My Roommate Is a Gumiho (간 떨어지는 동거; May 26 – July 15, 2021)
 The Road: Tragedy of One (더 로드: 1의 비극; August 4 – September 9, 2021)
 Hometown (홈타운; September 22 – October 28, 2021)
 Melancholia (멜랑꼴리아; November 10 – December 30, 2021)
 The Witch's Diner (마녀식당으로 오세요; July 16 – August 13, 2021)
 Work Later, Drink Now (술꾼도시여자들; February 3 – February 18, 2022)
 Kill Heel (킬힐; March 9 – April 21, 2022) 
 The Killer's Shopping List (살인자의 쇼핑목록; April 27 – May 19, 2022) 
 Eve (이브; June 1 – July 21, 2022) 
 Adamas (아다마스; July 27 – September 15, 2022) 
 Love in Contract (월수금화목토; September 21 – November 10, 2022) 
 Yumi's Cells 2 (유미의 세포들 2; November 16 – December 29, 2022)
 Poong, the Joseon Psychiatrist 2 (조선 정신과 의사 유세풍 2; January 11 – February 9, 2023)
 The Heavenly Idol (성스러운 아이돌; February 15, 2023 – present)
 Stealer: The Treasure Keeper (스틸러: 일곱 개의 조선통보; April 12, 2023)

Wednesday–Thursday (23:00)

 Hyena (하이에나; October 11 – November 30, 2006)
 Mermaid Story (인어 이야기; January 17–18, 2007)
 Romance Hunter (로맨스 헌터; February 7 – May 23, 2007)
 The Great Catsby (위대한 캣츠비; July 4 – September 20, 2007)
 12 Signs of Love (일년에 열두 남자; February 15 – April 5, 2012)
 Queen and I (인현왕후의 남자; April 18 – June 7, 2012)
 I Need Romance 2012 (로맨스가 필요해 2012; June 20 – August 9, 2012)
 The Third Hospital (제3병원; September 5 – November 8, 2012)
 Criminal Minds (크리미널 마인드; July 26 – September 28, 2017)

Wednesday (23:00)
 The Blue Tower (푸른거탑; January 23 – July 10, 2013)
 Fantasy Tower (환상거탑; July 17 – September 4, 2013)
 The Blue Tower ZERO (푸른거탑 제로; September 11 – November 20, 2013)
 The Blue Tower Returns (푸른거탑 리턴즈; November 27, 2013 – February 26, 2014)
 The Golden Tower (황금거탑; July 23 – December 3, 2014)

Thursday (21:00)
 Hospital Playlist (슬기로운 의사생활; March 12 – May 28, 2020)
 Hospital Playlist 2 (슬기로운 의사생활 2; June 17 – September 16, 2021)

Thursday (23:00)
 She Is Wow (우와한 녀; April 18 – July 4, 2013)
 Let's Eat (식샤를 합시다; November 28, 2013 – March 13, 2014)
 The Idle Mermaid (잉여공주; August 7 – October 9, 2014)

Friday–Saturday

Friday–Saturday (20:00)
 The K2 (더 케이투; September 23 – November 12, 2016)
 Guardian: The Lonely and Great God (도깨비; December 2, 2016 – January 21, 2017)
 Tomorrow, with You (내일 그대와; February 3 – March 25, 2017)
 Chicago Typewriter (시카고타자기; April 7 – June 3, 2017)

Friday–Saturday (20:30)

 Reply 1994 (응답하라 1994; October 18 – December 28, 2013)
 Emergency Couple (응급남녀; January 24 – April 5, 2014)
 Gap-dong (갑동이; April 11 – June 21, 2014)
 Marriage, Not Dating (연애 말고 결혼; July 4 – August 23, 2014)
 Plus Nine Boys (아홉수 소년; August 29 – October 11, 2014)
 Misaeng: Incomplete Life (미생; October 17 – December 20, 2014)
 Heart to Heart (하트 투 하트; January 9 – March 7, 2015)
 Super Daddy Yeol (슈퍼대디 열; March 13 – May 2, 2015)
 Ex-Girlfriends' Club (구여친 클럽; May 8 – June 13, 2015)
 Oh My Ghost (오 나의 귀신님; July 3 – August 22, 2015)
 Second 20s (두번째 스무살; August 28 – October 17, 2015)
 Reply 1988 (응답하라 1988; November 6, 2015 – January 16, 2016)
 Signal (시그널; January 22 – March 12, 2016)
 Memory (기억; March 18 – May 7, 2016)
 Dear My Friends (디어 마이 프렌즈; May 13 – July 2, 2016)
 The Good Wife (굿 와이프; July 8 – August 27, 2016)

Friday–Saturday (22:10)
 Island Part 1 (아일랜드; February 10 – February 25, 2023)

Friday–Saturday (22:40)
 Happiness (해피니스; November 5 – December 11, 2021)
 Bad and Crazy (배드 앤 크레이지; December 17, 2021 – January 28, 2022)
 Sh**ting Stars (별똥별; April 22 – June 11, 2022)
 Blind (블라인드; September 16 – November 5, 2022)

Friday–Saturday (22:50)
 Dark Hole (다크홀; April 30 – June 5, 2021)
 Voice 4 (보이스 4; June 18 – July 31, 2021)
 Yumi's Cells (유미의 세포들; September 17 – October 30, 2021)
  Work Later, Drink Now 2 (술꾼도시여자들 2; March 3, 2023)

Friday–Saturday (23:00)
 Cinderella with Four Knights (신데렐라와 네 명의 기사; August 12 – October 1, 2016)
 Entourage (안투라지; November 4 – December 24, 2016)

Friday (23:00)

 Fight (맞짱; October 24 – December 12, 2008)
 Mrs. Town (미세스타운 남편이 죽었다; November 13, 2009 – January 29, 2010)
 Golden House (위기일발 풍년빌라; March 5 – May 7, 2010)
 Joseon X-Files (기찰비록; August 20 – October 29, 2010)
 Once Upon a Time in Saengchori (원스 어폰 어 타임 인 생초리; November 5, 2010 – March 18, 2011)
 Monstar (몬스타; May 17 – August 2, 2013)
 Big Forest (빅 포레스트; September 7 – November 9, 2018)
Top Star U-back (톱스타 유백이; November 16, 2018 – January 25, 2019)
 Ugly Miss Young-Ae 17 (막돼먹은 영애씨 17; February 8 – April 26, 2019)
 Pegasus Market (쌉니다 천리마마트; September 20 – December 6, 2019)

Saturday–Sunday

Saturday–Sunday (21:00)

 Stranger (비밀의 숲; June 10 – July 30, 2017)
 Live Up to Your Name (명불허전; August 12 – October 1, 2017)
 Revolutionary Love (변혁의 사랑; October 14 – December 3, 2017)
 The Most Beautiful Goodbye (세상에서 가장 아름다운 이별; December 9–17, 2017)
 A Korean Odyssey (화유기; December 23, 2017 – March 4, 2018)
 Live (라이브; March 10 – May 6, 2018)
 Lawless Lawyer (무법 변호사; May 12 – July 1, 2018)
 Mr. Sunshine (미스터 션샤인; July 7 – September 30, 2018)
 Room No. 9 (나인룸; October 6 – November 25, 2018)
 Memories of the Alhambra (알함브라 궁전의 추억; December 1, 2018 – January 20, 2019)
 Romance Is a Bonus Book (로맨스는 별책부록; January 26 – March 17, 2019)
 Confession (자백; March 23 – May 12, 2019)
 Arthdal Chronicles Part 1–2 (아스달 연대기; June 1 – July 7, 2019)
 Hotel del Luna (호텔 델루나; July 13 – September 1, 2019)
 Arthdal Chronicles Part 3 (아스달 연대기; September 7 – 22, 2019)
 Melting Me Softly (날 녹여주오; September 28 – November 17, 2019)
 Crash Landing on You (사랑의 불시착; December 14, 2019 – February 16, 2020)
 Hi Bye, Mama! (하이바이, 마마!; February 22 – April 19, 2020)
 When My Love Blooms (화양연화 – 삶이 꽃이 되는 순간; April 25 – June 14, 2020)
 It's Okay to Not Be Okay (사이코지만 괜찮아; June 20 – August 9, 2020)
 Stranger 2  (비밀의 숲 2; August 15 – October 4, 2020)
 Start-Up (스타트업; October 17 – December 6, 2020)
 Mr. Queen (철인왕후; December 12, 2020 – February 14, 2021)
 Vincenzo (빈센조; February 20 – May 2, 2021)
 Mine (마인; May 8 – June 27, 2021)
 The Devil Judge (악마판사; July 3 – August 22, 2021)
 Hometown Cha-Cha-Cha (갯마을 차차차; August 28 – October 17, 2021)
 Jirisan (지리산; October 23 – December 12, 2021)
 Bulgasal: Immortal Souls (불가살; December 18, 2021 – February 6, 2022)

Saturday–Sunday (21:10)
 Twenty-Five Twenty-One (스물다섯 스물하나; February 12 – April 3, 2022)
 Our Blues (우리들의 블루스; April 9 – June 12, 2022)
 Alchemy of Souls Part 1 (환혼; June 18 – August 28, 2022)
 Little Women (작은 아씨들; September 3 – October 9, 2022)
 Under the Queen's Umbrella (슈룹; October 15 – December 4, 2022)
 Alchemy of Souls Part 2 (환혼; December 10, 2022 – January 8, 2023)
 Crash Course in Romance (일타 스캔들; January 14 – March 5, 2023)
 Pandora: Beneath the Paradise (판도라: 조작된 낙원; March 11, 2023 – present)

Sunday (21:00)
 21st Century Family (21세기 가족; March 11 – April 29, 2012)
 The Three Musketeers (삼총사; August 17 – November 2, 2014)
 Great Stories (위대한 이야기; 2015)

Sitcoms

Monday–Thursday (20:50)
 Potato Star 2013QR3 (감자별 2013QR3; 2013–2014)

Thursday–Friday (19:00)
 Ugly Miss Young-Ae season 1 (막돼먹은 영애씨; 2007)

Thursday (23:00)
 Ugly Miss Young-Ae season 11 (2012–2013)
 Ugly Miss Young-Ae season 12 (2013)
 Ugly Miss Young-Ae season 13 (2014)

Friday (22:00)
 Ugly Miss Young-Ae season 2 (2007–2008)
 Ugly Miss Young-Ae season 3 (2008)
 Ugly Miss Young-Ae season 4 (2008)
 Ugly Miss Young-Ae season 5 (2009)
 Ugly Miss Young-Ae season 6 (2009–2010)
 Ugly Miss Young-Ae season 7 (2010)
 Ugly Miss Young-Ae season 8 (2010–2011)
 Ugly Miss Young-Ae season 9 (2011–2012)
 Ugly Miss Young-Ae season 10 (2012)
 Flower Grandpa Investigation Unit (꽃할배 수사대; 2014)

Friday (23:30)
 The Superman Age (초인시대; 2015)

Saturday (01:20)
 Play Guide (플레이가이드; 2013)

Sunday (24:00)
 Roller Coaster Plus Date Big Bang (롤러코스터 플러스 연애빅뱅; 2010)

Variety shows
{{columns-list|colwidth=35em|
  (롤러코스터; 2009–2013) 
  (화성인 바이러스; 2009–2013)
 Comedy Big League (코미디빅리그; 2011–present) 
 Korea's Got Talent (코리아 갓 탤런트; 2011–2012) 
 Saturday Night Live Korea (새터데이 나이트 라이브 코리아; 2011–2017)
 The Romantic & Idol (더로맨틱&아이돌; 2012–2013) 
 Super Diva (슈퍼 디바; 2012)
 WIN: Who Is Next (2013)
 Grandpas Over Flowers (꽃보다 할배; 2013–2018)
 Sisters Over Flowers (꽃보다 누나; 2013)
 The Genius (더 지니어스; 2013–2015)
 The Genius: Rules of the Game (더 지니어스: 게임의 법칙; 2013)
 The Genius: Rule Breaker (더 지니어스: 룰 브레이커; 2013–2014)
 The Genius: Black Garnet (더 지니어스: 블랙가넷; 2014)
 The Genius: Grand Final (더지니어스: 그랜드 파이널; 2015)
 Youth Over Flowers (꽃보다 청춘; 2014–2016)
  (오늘부터 출근; 2014)
 Three Meals a Day (삼시세끼; 2014–2020)
 Three Meals a Day: Jeongseon Village 1 (삼시세끼-정선편 1; 2014–2015)
 Three Meals a Day: Fishing Village 1 (삼시세끼-어촌편 1; 2015–2016)
 Three Meals a Day: Jeongseon Village 2 (삼시세끼-정선편 2; 2015)
 Three Meals a Day: Fishing Village 2 (삼시세끼-어촌편 2; 2015)
 Three Meals a Day: Gochang Village (삼시세끼-고창편; 2016)
 Three Meals a Day: Fishing Village 3 (삼시세끼-어촌편 3; 2016)
 Three Meals a Day: Seaside Ranch (삼시세끼-바다목장편; 2017)
 Three Meals a Day: Mountain Village (삼시세끼-산촌 편; 2019)
 Three Meals a Day: Fishing Village 5 (삼시세끼-어촌편 5; 2020)
 WE KID (위키드; 2016) (simulcast on Mnet)
 Boys24 (소년24; 2016) (simulcast on Mnet)
 Babel 250 (바벨250; 2016)
 HIT the STAGE (힛 더 스테이지; 2016) (simulcast on Mnet)
 Society Game (소사이어티게임; 2016–2017)
 New Journey to the West (신서유기; 2016–2020)
  (버저비터; 2017)
 Island Trio (섬총사; 2017–2018)
 Where Is Mr. Kim (김무명을 찾아라; 2017–2018)
 Salty Tour (짠내투어; 2017–2020)
 Youn's Kitchen (윤식당; 2017–2018)
 Kang's Kitchen (신서유기 외전 강식당; 2017–2019)
 Seoul Mate (서울메이트; 2017–2019)
 Friendly Driver (친절한 기사단; 2018)
 Little Cabin In The Woods (숲속의 작은 집; 2018)
 Street Food Fighter (스트리트 푸드 파이터; 2018–2019)
 4 Wheeled Restaurant (현지에서 먹힐까; 2018–2020)
 Food Diary (식량일기; 2018)
  (선다방; 2018)
 Great Escape (대탈출; 2018–present)
 Galileo: The Space Awakens (갈릴레오 : 깨어난 우주; 2018)
  (수미네 반찬; 2018–2020)
 DoReMi Market (도레미 마켓; 2018–present)
 You Quiz on the Block (유 퀴즈 온 더 블럭; 2018–present)
 Weekend Playlist (주말 사용 설명서; 2018–2019)
 Coffee Friends (커피 프렌즈; 2019)
 Korean Hostel in Spain (스페인 하숙; 2019)
 Show! Audio Jockey (쇼! 오디오자키; 2019)
 Prison Life of Fools (호구들의 감빵생활; 2019)
 Super Hearer (슈퍼히어러; 2019)
 Player 7 (플레이어; 2019)
 The Ranksters (뭐든지 프렌즈; 2019)
 Laborhood on Hire (일로 만난 사이; 2019)
 Trans-Siberian Pathfinders (시베리아 선발대; 2019)
 V-1 (2019)
 Wednesday Music Playlist (2019)
  (케이팝 어학당-노랫말싸미; 2020)
 Decoding Meow (냐옹은 페이크다; 2020)<ref>

Talk shows
 Live Talk Show Taxi (현장 토크쇼 택시; 2007–2017)
 Baek Ji-yeon's People Inside (백지연의 끝장토론; 2010–2013)
 Little Big Hero (리틀빅 히어로; 2012–present)
 Kim Mi-kyung Show (김미경 쇼; 2013)
 Coolkkadang (쿨까당; 2012–present)
 Problematic Men (문제적남자; 2015–present)
 Life Bar (인생술집; 2016–2019)
 The Dictionary of Useless Knowledge (알아두면 쓸데없는 신비한 잡학사전; 2017–present)

See also
 List of programs broadcast by Arirang TV
 List of programmes broadcast by Korean Broadcasting System
 List of programs broadcast by Seoul Broadcasting System
 List of programmes broadcast by tvN (Asia)
 List of programs broadcast by JTBC

References

External links
  

tvN
tvN